Kenan was a patriarch mentioned in the Hebrew Bible.

Kenan may also refer to:

 Kenan (name)
 Cianán (fl. 489), Irish saint
 Kenan Institute for Ethics, Duke University
 Kenan Systems, billing software systems company acquired by Lucent and later by Comverse
 Kenan (TV series), a 2021 American comedy series

See also
 Conan (disambiguation)
 Cynan